Robert Hart Logan (1772 – 13 April 1838) was a Canadian politician, active in England.

Born in Canada, to a Scottish family, Logan was educated in Montreal.  He travelled as part of a delegation to the British government, to provide information on Canada, and to petition for the union of the Canadian provinces.  He married an English woman, Nancy Service, and purchased Kentwell Hall in Suffolk.  He commissioned Thomas Hopper to remodel the house's interior in the Gothic style.

Logan served as a magistrate and a deputy-lieutenant for Suffolk, and in 1828 he was High Sheriff of Suffolk.  At the 1835 UK general election, he stood unsuccessfully for the Conservative Party in the Western Division of Suffolk.  He stood again in the 1837 UK general election, on this occasion winning a seat.  He served until his death, the following year.

References

1772 births
1838 deaths
Canadian emigrants to England
Conservative Party (UK) MPs for English constituencies
High Sheriffs of Suffolk
People from Montreal
UK MPs 1837–1841